The Borden River is a river in Sudbury District in northeastern Ontario, Canada. It is in the James Bay drainage basin, and is a left tributary of the Nemegosenda River.

Course
The river begins at the northwest bay of Borden Lake in geographic Cochrane Township, and flows north under Ontario Highway 101. It heads northeast, then east, enters geographic Borden Township, and takes in the left tributary Briggs Creek. The heads southeast, takes in the right tributary Westover Creek, then flows northeast through the Mate Lakes where it enters geographic McGee Township. It briefly flows northeast through the southeast corner of the township, continues northeast into geographic Chewett Township, then turns northwest and reaches its mouth at the southern tip of Nemegosenda Lake. Nemegosenda Lake flows via the Nemegosenda River, the Kapuskasing River, the Mattagami River and the Moose River to James Bay.

Tributaries
Westover Creek (right)
Briggs Creek (left)

References

Sources

Rivers of Sudbury District